Capel Salem is a Grade II-listed building in Pwllheli, Gwynedd, Wales. Built in 1862, it was remodelled and enlarged in 1893. A fire was started in 1913 by a local person who tried to steal money from the chapel; when he found none he set fire to the building. It was then closed until 1915 after restoration.

References

Pwllheli
Pwllheli, Capel Salem
Chapels in Gwynedd